LongCheng High School is a senior high school in Longgang district, Shenzhen. Located in the south of the Qinglingjing Forest Park, it is the largest school in area in Shenzhen.

History

Founded in 1995, it was previously named "Longcheng middle school". In 2004, the junior division and the senior division were separated into two individual schools, "Longcheng junior high school" and "Longcheng senior high school".

References

External links
 

High schools in Shenzhen
Longgang District, Shenzhen